Kutjevo Abbey, also known as Gotó was a Cistercian monastery in what is now Croatia, in the area of Slavonia, 23 km north-east of Požega.

History 
The monastery was founded in 1232 as a daughter-house of Zirc Abbey in Hungary, of the filiation of Clairvaux. The Cistercians planted the vineyards, which are still cultivated today. After the Turkish attack of 1521 (or 1529), the monastery was dissolved and subsequently destroyed.

In 1689, the monastery estate was granted by Emperor Leopold I to Ivan Babić, a canon of Zagreb, who was named titular abbot. In 1698, the site was re-settled by the Jesuits, who remained there until 1773. In 1882, the property was acquired by Vjenceslav Turković and Franjo Türk, who developed a significant wine production on it. After World War II, this was conducted as a Socialist enterprise.

Buildings and precinct 
The existing building complex was built by the Jesuits in the 18th century on the ruins of the Cistercian monastery. The former monastery church, dedicated to the Blessed Virgin Mary, still stands.

See also
 List of Jesuit sites

References 
Becking, Gereon Christoph Maria, 2000: Zisterzienserklöster in Europa, Kartensammlung, map 76. Lukas Verlag Berlin 
Turković, Milan, 1935: Prošlost opatije B. Dj. Marije vallis honesta de Gotho seu Kuttyeva: 1323-1773; Sušak: Primorski štamparski zavod

External links 
Dvorci.hr: website about the monastery 
Cistercensi: Kutjevo

Cistercian monasteries
Roman Catholic monasteries in Croatia
Society of Jesus
History of Croatia by location
Christian monasteries established in the 13th century
Christian monasteries established in the 18th century
Buildings and structures in Požega-Slavonia County